Super TV2 is a commercial television channel in Hungary, owned by the TV2 Group. It is rivaling with RTL II and Viasat 3. The channel launched on 2 November 2012.

Programs 
 90210
 Combat Hospital
 Getaway
 Mr. Sunshine
 Ninas Mal
 NYC 22
 The Pacific
 Pan Am
 Ringer
 Sue Thomas: F.B.Eye
 Necessary Roughness
 Flashpoint
 Las Vegas
 How to Be a Gentleman
 Lipstick Jungle
 Breaking In
 The Client List
 A Nagy Duett (The Great Duet - television show)
 Jóban Rosszban (Hungarian soap opera)
 Super Mokka (daytime talk show)
 Super TV2 rajzfilmek (cartoons)
 Tények Hatkor (Facts at Six - news)
 Sztárban sztár +1 kicsi (Your Face Sounds Familiar (kids version))

References

Television networks in Hungary
Television channels and stations established in 2012